Sturisoma brevirostre is a species of armored catfish endemic to Brazil where it is found in the Içá River basin.  This species grows to a length of  SL.

References
 

Sturisoma
Endemic fauna of Brazil
Fish of Brazil
Fish of South America
Fish described in 1889